Barnum Island is a hamlet and census-designated place (CDP) in Nassau County, New York, United States. The population was 2,590 at the 2020 census. It occupies the eastern portion of an island situated between Long Island and Long Beach. That island, previously known in its entirety as Hog Island, consists entirely of the communities of Barnum Island, Island Park, and Harbor Island.

Barnum Island is an unincorporated area of the Town of Hempstead. Most of Barnum Island is separated from the Village of Island Park by the LIRR's Long Beach Branch rail line to Long Beach.

Barnum Island has its own fire district and school district, but is under contract with the Village of Island Park for fire and education services for its residents. Barnum Island is included in the Island Park School District and ZIP code (11558).

The E.F. Barrett Power Station is located within the hamlet.

History
Previously called Hog Island, after the feral pigs introduced by early European explorers to the Native Americans, it was later renamed for Sarah Ann Baldwin Barnum. It was also sometimes called Jekyl Island, after the name of the development company that bought it from the county.

Between 1851 and 1870, Sarah Ann's husband Peter owned large parcels of land on Long Island, though his primary business was a Manhattan clothier. Sarah Ann arranged the purchase of Hog Island for use as a "poor farm" – a self-supporting almshouse, a social innovation for that period, and the island was renamed in her honor.

Local lore connects the island's name to P.T. Barnum, the circus impresario, but this is incorrect, and likely  due to confusion between "PT" and "PC" (Peter C.).

The county discontinued the almshouse and sold the island to the Jekyl Island Realty Company in 1898 for $40,000. The company renamed it Jekyl Island. The island changed hands several times in 1909, Jekyl sold it to a syndicate of developers for $120,000, who in turn sold it for $650,000 in 1911. (There may have been an interim sale in 1910 as well.) Minimal development at that time included construction of several canals, before work was abandoned. One of those canals divides the Harbor Isle section from Island Park.

New developers bought the island in 1921, and started building about 10,000 properties built in the 700 acre Island Park section in the center of the island starting in 1922. It was in use as a summer resort by 1925., Island Park was incorporated as a village in 1926.

The rest of the island remains unincorporated, with the western portion known as Harbor Island, and the eastern portion retaining the name Barnum Island. However, all three make up the original Hog Island/Barnum Island, and are part of the Town of Hempstead.

The entire island was flooded with two to eight feet of water and sewage by Hurricane Sandy.

Geography

Barnum Island is located at  (40.605203, -73.647403).

Demographics

As of the census of 2020, there were 2,590 people, 1,062 housing units, and 958 households residing in the CDP. The population density was 2,877.7 per square mile (1,111.1/km2). There were 1,062 housing units at an average density of 1,180/sq mi (455.7/km2). The racial makeup of the CDP was 68.03% White, 2.97% African American, 0.73% Native American, 6.06% Asian, 0.00% Pacific Islander, 9.22% from other races, and 9.53% from two or more races. Hispanic or Latino of any race were 19.45% of the population.

There were 958 households, out of which 58.9% were married couples living together, 11.1% had a female householder with no spouse present, and 28.0% had a male householder with no spouse present. 

In the CDP, the population was spread out, with 6.2% under the age of 5, 18.0% under the age of 18, 82.0% was 18 years or older and 19.9% who were 65 years of age or older. The median age was 47 years. For every 100 females, there were 148.2 males.

The median income for a household in the CDP was $102,955. About 7.9% of the population were below the poverty line, including 19.9% of those under age 18 and 3.9% of those age 65 or over.

Nunley's Ferris wheel
Nunley's Ferris wheel, formerly located at Nunley's Carousel and Amusement Park on the Baldwin-Freeport, New York border, is now located in Barnum Island, in Baldwin, New York. Nassau County purchased Nunley's Carousel in 1995, restored it, and reopened it in 2009 at the Cradle of Aviation Museum in Garden City, New York. Other Nunley's rides and games were sold at auction after the park closed in 1995 and are now scattered all over the country.

References

Hempstead, New York
Census-designated places in New York (state)
Hamlets in New York (state)
Census-designated places in Nassau County, New York
Hamlets in Nassau County, New York
Populated coastal places in New York (state)